Han Dong (born November 11, 1980) is a Chinese actor. He rose to fame for his role as Ninth prince in the historical drama Scarlet Heart.

Biography 
Han was born in  Xiaoshan District, Hangzhou, Zhejiang, China. He went to Central South University and majored in Civil Engineering. After graduating from college, he entered an engineering state-owned enterprise. On a holiday, Han Dong went home to accompany his friends to participate in the selection of a performing arts school. There he met the director You Xiaogang who brought Han Dong to Beijing where he started his career as an actor.

Filmography

Film

Television series

Awards and nominations

References

External links 
 Han Dong (IMDb)

1980 births
Living people
Male actors from Hangzhou
Central South University alumni
21st-century Chinese male actors
Chinese male television actors 
Chinese male film actors